Marlón Cornejo (born 14 September 1993) is a Salvadoran professional footballer who plays as a midfielder.

Club career
Cornejo signed with Alianza for the Clausura 2018 tournament, showing a great level in matches. One of his most prominent games was an Apertura 2018 tournament match against Chalatenango, Cornejo scored the only goal of the game in an away victory (0–1).

Honours
 Santa Tecla
 Primera División (1): Clausura 2015

References

Living people
1993 births
Association football midfielders
El Salvador international footballers
Salvadoran footballers
Santa Tecla F.C. footballers